Ralph C. Fritz (November 23, 1917 – February 4, 2002) was an American football player and coach.  A native of New Kensington, Pennsylvania, Fritz attended The Kiski School before enrolling at the University of Michigan.  He played guard for the Michigan Wolverines football team from 1939 to 1940.  In 1940, he was chosen by conference coaches as a first-team player on the Associated Press All-Big Ten Conference team. Fritz later played professional football for the Philadelphia Eagles in 1941.  Fritz was one of the more than 1,000 NFL personnel who served in the military during World War II.  Starting in 1949, Fritz worked as a high school football coach in Wauchula, Florida.  In 1954, Fritz was hired as the athletic director and football coach at Lake Wales High School in Lake Wales, Florida.  Fritz died in 2002 at age 84 while living in Miami, Florida.

References

1917 births
2002 deaths
People from New Kensington, Pennsylvania
Players of American football from Pennsylvania
American football offensive guards
Michigan Wolverines football players
Philadelphia Eagles players